Dragoljub Miladin Čirić (12 November 1935 – 17 August 2014) was a Serbian-Yugoslavian chess grandmaster.

Background 
Čirić was born in Novi Sad in 1935. He gained the International Master title in 1961 and became a Grandmaster in 1965.

Notable team results
Čirić played for Yugoslavia in the Olympiads of 1966 and 1968.  His results were:

 17th Chess Olympiad 1966 Havana – Čirić scored a perfect 8/8 playing as second reserve, and Yugoslavia finished 4th.
 18th Chess Olympiad 1968 Lugano – Čirić scored 5/7 and Yugoslavia finished 2nd, receiving silver medals.

Čirić also played in the European Team Chess Championship twice, in 1961 and 1965.  His results were as follows:

 2nd European Team Championship 1961 Oberhausen – Čirić scored 6½/9 on board 7, receiving an individual gold medal.  Yugoslavia finished 2nd (behind USSR) receiving silver medals.
 3rd European Team Championship 1965 Hamburg – Čirić scored 4/8 on board 9, receiving an individual silver medal.  Yugoslavia again finished 2nd behind USSR for team silver.

Notable individual results 

Chigorin Memorial 1965: 3rd (the winners were Wolfgang Unzicker and Boris Spassky)
Sarajevo 1966: 1st= 11/15 (with Mikhail Tal)
Hoogovens Beverwijk 1967: 3rd (the winner was Spassky)
Sarajevo 1968: 1st= 10/15 (with Anatoly Lein)

Death 
His death at the age of 78 was announced by the Belgrade Chess Federation on 17 August 2014.

References

External links 
 
 

2014 deaths
1935 births
Yugoslav chess players
Serbian chess players
Chess grandmasters